Lac de Caderolles (also known as Lac de la Mane) is a lake near Bagnères-de-Bigorre in Hautes-Pyrénées, France. At an elevation of 1988 m, its surface area is 0.014 km².

Lakes of Hautes-Pyrénées